Ali Soufi is an Iranian reformist politician. He held various offices as governors and ministers for three decades during the 1980s, 1990s, and 2000s.

He is a member of the 'Reformists' Supreme Council for Policymaking'.

Soufi enrolled to run for parliament in 2008 and 2016 elections but was disqualified by the Guardian Council.

References

Living people
Islamic Iran Participation Front politicians
Union of Islamic Iran People Party politicians
Government ministers of Iran
Iranian governors
Members of the Reformists' Supreme Council for Policymaking
Year of birth missing (living people)
Iranian campaign managers